Whip-Ma-Whop-Ma-Gate is a street in York, England, known for its short length and unusual name. A continuation of Colliergate, it runs south to meet Pavement, Fossgate, and the Stonebow, and is adjoined by St Saviourgate on its eastern side. St Crux Parish Hall, originally one of York's medieval churches, backs onto it.

The street's name was first recorded in 1505 as Whitnourwhatnourgate, and later appears as Whitney Whatneygate. It seems to mean "neither-one-thing-nor-the-other street", although a plaque on the end of the parish hall suggests the meaning "what a street!" In 17th and 18th century documents, the alternative name Salvey Rents or Salvegate is also found.

Whip-Ma-Whop-Ma is the title of a novel by York author Martyn Clayton.

References

Streets in York